The men's 4 × 400 metres relay event at the 2007 Summer Universiade was held on 13–14 July.

Medalists

*Athletes who participated in heats only.

Results

Heats
Qualification: First 2 teams of each heat (Q) plus the next 2 fastest (q) qualified for the final.

Final

References
Results

Relay
2007